Kevin Woodford (born 4 June 1950) is a British celebrity chef and television personality.

Career
He originally trained as a chef and then moved into education as a lecturer in professional cookery. After gaining a higher degree in the Management of Organisations he returned to education as Head of Hotel and Catering Studies at a Granville College in Sheffield.

He was a Senior Examiner for City and Guilds Professional Cookery Examinations, judge at several International Cookery Competitions and worked as a hotel and restaurant consultant for various national and some International organisations.

Kevin is currently working with Stena Line to develop menus for their 7 Irish Sea passenger ferries. Kevin is also helping train their galley chefs and on board service managers as part of a package developing sales and improving the customer experience.

Television presenting and acting career
His first TV appearance was on This Morning, and this was followed by him presenting The Reluctant Cook for BBC2, followed by Surprise Chefs for ITV. He then became a regular chef on the BBC cookery show, Ready Steady Cook, as well as presenting Can't Cook, Won't Cook for which he won a National Television Award for Best Daytime Presenter. More recently, he presented and co-produced a 104 part series of a CBBC cookery show, Planet Cook in which he played "Captain Cook". It later aired on Channel 4 and the series was first shown coast to coast in Australia and was a huge hit.

He has also presented Songs of Praise and the live topical debate magazine show The Heaven and Earth Show.

He travelled the world as Jill Dando's co-presenter on BBC Summer Holiday and Presenter for BBC's Holiday programme for 5 years.

He has also acting roles in Doctors (Robert Hale). For BBC's 'Fasten your Seatbelt' series he demonstrated his ability as a New York taxi driver, entertainer on board 'Oriana', deck hand on a tall ship, and concierge at the Mandarin Oriental Hotel in Hong Kong.

He presented Big Kevin, Little Kevin for the BBC, has written and published 7 cookery books and is the only chef in Europe to have had his own recipes used on a set of Isle of Man postage stamps and was the recipient of 'This is Your Life' for BBC1. He has also appeared on Lily Savage's Blankety Blank.

Woodford began reporting on consumer show Watchdog in 2015. Woodford now appears on GB News Saturday Morning Show with Esther McVey and Philip Davies. In addition he also appears occasionally on Steve Wright in the Afternoon on BBC Radio 2.

Business ventures
Woodford owned a restaurant in Douglas, Isle of Man for several years.

During 2009 he developed a small boutique hotel called Birchfield House in Douglas.

Woodford is also an after dinner speaker

References

External links
 

1950 births
British television presenters
Living people
British television chefs
Manx male actors
British male television actors
British businesspeople
British television personalities
Manx culture
21st-century Manx male actors
21st-century Manx writers
20th-century Manx writers
20th-century Manx male actors